Christopher Peter Demetral (born November 14, 1976) is an American former actor best known as Jeremy Tupper, the son of newly divorced New York book editor Martin Tupper (played by Brian Benben) on the HBO series Dream On and also Jack in Lois & Clark: The New Adventures of Superman. He played the title character in the short-lived series The Secret Adventures of Jules Verne on the Sci Fi Channel. He also played Christopher Ewing in Dallas: J.R. Returns.

Filmography

Awards and nominations

External links
 
 Interview with WickedInfo.com

1976 births
Living people
Male actors from Michigan
American male child actors
American male television actors
American male film actors
American male voice actors
People from Royal Oak, Michigan
20th-century American male actors
21st-century American male actors